Siedliska-Bogusz  is a village in the administrative district of Gmina Brzostek, within Dębica County, Subcarpathian Voivodeship, in south-eastern Poland.

The village has a population of 1,000.

References

Siedliska-Bogusz